Per Holm (born 2 December 1936) is a Danish sailor. He competed in the 5.5 Metre event at the 1964 Summer Olympics.

References

External links
 

1936 births
Living people
Danish male sailors (sport)
Olympic sailors of Denmark
Sailors at the 1964 Summer Olympics – 5.5 Metre
Sportspeople from Copenhagen